The Bianchi Cup is a major action pistol tournament in the United States, usually held over three days in late May. Since 1984 the National Rifle Association of America has designated it their National Action Pistol Championship. It is normally held in Columbia, Missouri, at the Green Valley Rifle & Pistol Club. It has the largest purse of any tournament on the action pistol calendar and is the premier action pistol championship tournament in the world. The Bianchi Cup is the only major shooting tournament that has retained its original course of fire since its inception.

It is one of the most prestigious events in action shooting,  with the best shooters in the world in competition each May in Missouri.  Due to the diversity of stages, the tournament is widely considered one of the most difficult championships in all of the shooting sports.

NRA Bianchi Cup 
The Bianchi Cup is traditionally held the week before Memorial Day weekend (i.e. the week before the last Monday in May) every year since its inception in 1979. It is the first tournament that turns the sport of competition shooting as a whole from amateur to professional status by offering the winner a large cash prize in addition to trophies. Before NRA took control in 1984 the overall winner took home the entire cash purse of $30,000 in addition to the Bianchi Cup itself. It has its origins in the law enforcement shooting community.  Recently, with the creation of the Production Division, it has become one of the fastest growing disciplines in the action shooting community.

The Bianchi Cup is one of the three championships of action shooting's triple crown, along with the IPSC U.S. Nationals, and the Steel Challenge.

Since its inception in 1979, 1985 championship year being the exception, the Bianchi Cup has retained its original courses of fire, consisting of four matches known as the "Events": Practical, Barricade, Moving Target and Falling Plates. Speed, accuracy, and precision, all three are equally important factors and are considered fundamentals that form the core of the match, but most importantly, strong mental discipline on match days is the ultimate key to winning the Championship. Such is the case in the open division, where the top finishers are known to shoot perfect scores of 1920 separated by x-counts and one bad shot out of 192 can easily put a potential winner down 10–15 places in the rankings. Each event is timed and is worth 480 points, equaling a total of 1920 possible points plus 192 tie-breaking x's. In 1985 Practical Event was temporarily replaced by the 60-shot, 600 points International Rapid Fire Event, almost identical to that of the ISSF 25 m Rapid Fire Pistol Match. The main differences for the Bianchi Cup/NRA Action Pistol version was that it must be fired from a standing, hands-over-shoulder starting position, gun holstered, on five Bianchi D-1 "Tombstone" cardboard targets placed 25 yards downrange, using center fire handguns, with the option of using the ground as support if one can make the time limit without incurring any late shot penalties. The total possible score for that year was 2040 points plus 204 x's. This sudden deviation from the original format proved unpopular so the organizers dropped it and re-instated the Practical Event the following year since.

Action pistol competitors are permitted to use a two-handed grip (except for the 8 second 10-yard weak-hand series in the Practical Event), and in most cases competitors must start from standing position with their guns holstered and hands above the shoulders. One exception being the Barricade Event, where competitors start with gun in holster and both hands on the barricade. During the course of the match, participants fire at turning or moving cardboard silhouette targets – known as the D-1 (or AP-1 as of 2007) "Tombstones", and steel plates that must be knocked down to count as hits.

The NRA National Action Shooting Tournament is a money-winning event. For his victory in 2008, Doug Koenig took home the 2008 Bianchi Cup trophy, plus total cash awards of over $8,000. Robert Vadasz Metallic Sight win netted him over $5000. For 2009, total prize money awarded increased over 30% from the previous year.  NRA continues to improve the Cup in the original spirit of John Bianchi's vision.  The already generous awards schedule has added additional prizes over the years for Newcomers, Juniors, & new for 2010 the Grand Senior category.  Sponsorship from major corporations such as MidwayUSA, Safariland, Smith & Wesson, Colt, & SIG Sauer have helped make this possible.

From 2009 30th Anniversary onwards, the NRA Bianchi Cup offers an Open Division, Metallic Division and the new Production Division to bring more shooters to the sport. Recent years have also introduced a Celebrity Pro-Am as a Saturday Event.  This fan favorite spectacle has included participants from the music, film, and television branches of the entertainment industry including Mark Wills, Michael Peterson, Marshall Teague and Michael Talbott. Cowboy Mounted Shooting sensation Kenda Lenseigne made her first appearance at the Celebrity Pro-AM in 2010 and won.

This event draws shooters from all over the world. In 2008, international competitors hailed from Australia, Canada, Germany, Italy, Japan, New Zealand, Netherlands, United Arab Emirates and the United States.

The Bianchi Cup is unique in that a newcomer's orientation is always held at the Competitor's meeting. Former & current Champions as well as the Match Staff are usually in attendance to help new shooters in their first attempt at the National Action Pistol Championship.

Class awards are awarded to various categories to include High Law Enforcement, High Woman, High Junior, High International, High Newcomer, High Senior, High Service, High Semi-Auto, High Revolver, and Aggregate.

NRA has re-instituted a few measures to lower entry fee cost. One was to "bring a buddy". If a competitor were to bring a friend who had never competed at the NRA Bianchi Cup, both competitors would have a reduced entry fee. NRA also offers reduced fees for Juniors, Production Firearms, Active Duty Military and those that register early.

History 
The event originated in 1979; by former police officer John Bianchi of holster maker Bianchi International, as a Law Enforcement Training Match. In conjunction with 1975 IPSC World Champion, Ray Chapman. and Richard Nichols, the first Bianchi Cup competition was held in 1979.
In 1984, the National Rifle Association re-designated the event the NRA Bianchi Cup, National Action Pistol Championship.
The competition has four stages, which make up the match aggregate. Each of these stages consists of 48 rounds for a total possible score of 480 for each stage and 1920 for a perfect overall score.

The four shooting events are:

The Practical Event: From the appropriate shooting line, the shooter fires at distances from 10 yards to 50 yards under varying time limits.

The Barricade Event: From within shooting boxes and behind barricades, a shooter fires at targets on either side of the barricade at different distances and under varying time limits.

The Falling Plate Event: From the appropriate shooting line, the shooter fires at 8-inch round, steel plates arranged in banks of six at distances from 10 to 25 yards under varying time limits.

The Moving Target Event: From within shooting boxes at distances ranging from 10 to 25 yards, the shooter fires at a target moving from left to right with the target being exposed for only 6 seconds.

Competitors shoot all these events from both standing and prone positions and are also required to shoot with both strong and weak hands at various stages. On top of these events, the championship also features many side events that do not impact the match aggregate score. The competitors use handguns. The most popular caliber choices are 9mm, .38 Spl., .38 Super, and .45 ACP. These pistols are drawn out of holsters when the signal to fire is given at each stage.

The first competitor to fire a perfect score was Doug Koenig of Pennsylvania in 1990 with a 1920-157X.

This event draws top shooters from all over the world. International competitors have hailed from Austria, Australia, Canada, Germany, Italy, Japan, Lithuania, the Netherlands, New Zealand, Norway, Philippines, Saudi Arabia (1987–1989), Republic of South Africa, Switzerland, Taiwan (1996), Thailand (1993 and 1994), and the United Kingdom.

The first NRA World Action Pistol Championship match was held in the United States at the present home of the NRA Bianchi Cup in Columbia, MO. 1994 was the first year; there were five countries competing for the Open Team event and three countries competing for the Women's Team event. Thereafter the World Action Pistol Championship was held in Adelaide Australia 1997, Hamilton New Zealand 1999, Italy 2001 and again in the USA in Columbia MO in 2004. The NRA World Action Pistol Championships were then to be rotated to sponsor countries every two years from 2006 (Australia, Blacktown Rifle & Pistol Club) and returning to the United States every eight years (2012). In 2008 it was conducted in Hamilton, New Zealand, November 5–8. For 2010, the event returned to Sydney, Australia at the Blacktown Rifle & Pistol Club.

Champions

NRA National Action Pistol Champion, winner of the Bianchi Cup
Metallic Division Champion, winner of the Metallic Division Cup
Production Division Champion, winner of the Production Division Cup
Women's Division Champion, winner of the Women's Division Cup
Senior Division Champion, winner of the John Cameron Memorial Cup
Junior Division Champion, winner of the Junior Division Cup

A new Bianchi Cup made of sterling silver is produced each year and awarded to the winner, as well as a silver Bianchi Champion belt buckle.  Smaller trophy cups & silver belt buckles emblazoned with the Bianchi Star are awarded to the division champions.

Previous champions 

Bianchi Cup Winners

1979:  Ron Lerch 1816-062x

1980:  Mickey Fowler 1889-085x

1981:  Mickey Fowler 1890-088x

1982:  Mickey Fowler 1903-145x

1983:  Brian Enos 1903-612x

1984:  Brian Enos 1910-257x

NRA National Action Pistol Champions

1985:  Rob Leatham 2034-155x

1986:   W. Riley Gilmore 1916-144x

1987:  John Pride 1912-151x

1988:  John Pride 1918-163x

1989:  Lemoine Wright 1914-152x

1990:  Doug Koenig 1920-157x

1991:  W. Riley Gilmore 1920-166x

1992:  Doug Koenig 1920-169x

1993:  Bruce Piatt 1920-170x

1993:  Brian Kilpatrick, Australia 1920-173x

1994:  John Pride 1920-174x

1995:  John Pride 1920-179x

1996:  Mickey Fowler 1918-184x

1996:  Ross G. Newell, Australia 1920-163x

1997:  Bruce Piatt 1920-181x

1998:  Doug Koenig 1920-180x

1999:  Bruce Piatt 1920-185x

2000:  Doug Koenig 1920-185x

2001:  Doug Koenig 1920-184x

2002:  Doug Koenig 1920-184x

2003:  Doug Koenig 1920-183x

2004:  Doug Koenig 1920-177x

2005:  Doug Koenig 1920-185x

2006:  Bruce Piatt 1920-177x

2007:  Doug Koenig 1920-185x

2008:  Doug Koenig 1918-185x

2009:  Bruce Piatt 1920–181x

2010:  Doug Koenig 1920-179x

2011:  Doug Koenig *1920-187x (High Score)

2012:  Doug Koenig 1920-182x

2013:  Doug Koenig 1920-183x

2014:  Kevin Angstadt 1920-171x

2015:  Doug Koenig 1920-180x

2016:  Doug Koenig 1920-183x

2017:  Doug Koenig 1920-184x

2018:  Adam Sokolowski 1920-176x

2019:  Bruce Piatt 1920–179x

2020: (Cancelled)

2021:  Doug Koenig 1920-182x

2022:  Benito Martinez 1920-165x

Stock Firearm (Production) Champions

1994:  Bruce Gray-Category Winner 1883-112x

1995:  Rod Jones-Category Winner 1810-105x

1996:  Bruce Gray-Category Winner 1889-125x

1997:  Steve Sweeney-Category Winner 1850-115x

Production Class Champions

2009:  Dave Sevigny 1806-101x

2010:  Kyle Schmidt 1856-121x

2011:  Rob Leatham 1883-132x (XD Tactical)

2012:  Vance Schmid 1887-118x (CZ SP01 Shadow)

2013:  Enoch Smith 1904-144x (Xdm 5.25)

2014:  Rob Leatham 1884-132x (Xdm 5.25)

2015:  Enoch Smith 1874-137x (Xdm 5.25)

2016:  Adam Sokolowski 3767-257x* (Xdm 5.25) *Score reflects combined main match and championship match score

2017:  Rob Leatham 1908-140x* (Xdm 5.25) *Score reflects championship match score only

2018:  Patrick Franks 1894-136x

2019:  Anthony Heinauer 1876-131x

2020: (Cancelled)

2021:  Christopher Hudock 1888-116x

2022:  Christopher Hudock 1900-135x

Production Optics Class Champions

2021:  Anthony Heinauer 1918-161x

2022:  Anthony Heinauer 1914-164x

Metallic Sight Firearm Champions

1998:  Chad Dietrich 1905-125x

1999:  Fred Craig 1863-127x

2000:  Rob Leatham 1897-145x

2001:  Vance Schmid 1896-130x

2002:  Rob Leatham 1884-136x

2003:  Frederick Craig 1886-128x

2004:  Rob Leatham 1905-144x

2005:  Rob Leatham 1910-153x

2006:  Rob Leatham 1902-145x

2007:  Rob Leatham 1902-153x

2008:  Rob Vadasz 1902-138x

2009:  Rob Leatham 1909-145x

2010:  Rob Vadasz 1904-146x

2011:  Rob Vadasz 1908-143x

2012:  Rob Vadasz 1878-135x

2013:  Rob Vadasz 1892-132x

2014:  Kevin Worrell 1907-127x

2015:  Patrick Franks 1902-140x

2016:  Patrick Franks 1901-140x

2017:  Adam Sokolowski 1914-143x

2018:  Rob Vadasz 1912-155x

2019:  Kyle Schmidt 1905-137x

2020: (Cancelled)

2021:  Rob Vadasz *1918-154x (High Score)

2022:  Ryan Franks 1914-156x

NRA National Action Pistol Women’s Champions

1980:  Edith Almeida 1821-073x

1981:  Edith Almeida 1652-045x

1982:  Edith Almeida 1304-077x

1983:  Sally Van Valzah 1765-091x

1984:  Lee Cole 1761-096x

1985:  Lee Cole 1957-119x

1986:  Christie Rogers 1759-096x

1987:  Lorna Pavelka 1787-088x

1988:  Christie Rogers 1836-111x

1989:  Yoko Shimomura 1882-129x

1990:  Christie Rogers 1885-124x

1991:  Janina Tenace 1888-134x

1992:  Lorna Pavelka 1899-142x

1993:  Judy Woolley 1898-148x

1994:  Judy Woolley 1906-148x

1995:  Dewi Hazeltine 1908-150x

1996:  Sharon Edington 1899-140x

1997:  Sharon Edington 1906-142x

1998:  Anita Mackiewicz 1914-148x

1999:  Vera Koo 1894-137x

2000:  Robyn Estreich 1902-157x

2001:  Vera Koo 1910-137x 

2002:  Vera Koo 1905-151x

2003:  Vera Koo 1894-141x

2004:  Vera Koo 1886-136x

2005:  Vera Koo 1894-149x

2006:  Vera Koo 1897-143x

2007:  Julie Goloski 1903-139x

2008:  Vera Koo 1870-136x

2009:  Julie Goloski Golob 1907-138x

2010:  Jessie Abbate 1906-163x

2011:  Jessie Harrison 1912-153x

2012:  Julie Golob 1907-144x

2013:  Jessie Duff 1893-142x

2014:  Jessie Duff 1893-135x

2015:  Anita Mackiewicz *1916-166x (High Score)

2016:  Tiffany Piper 1904-154x

2017:  Cherie Blake 1904-145x

2018:  Anita Mackiewicz 1911-153x

2019:  Cherie Blake 1906-153x

2020: (Cancelled)

2021:  Becky Yackley 1908-139x 

2022:  Sally Talbot 1913-155x 

NRA World Action Pistol Champions – Open

1994:  John Pride 1920-174x

1997:  Adrian Hunter 1920-150x

1999:  Doug Koenig 1920-180x

2004:  Doug Koenig 1920-177x

2006:  Bruce Piatt 1920-176x

2008:  Doug Koenig 1920-181x

2010:  Doug Koenig *1920-188x (High Score)

NRA World Action Pistol Champions – Metallic

1994: N/A

1997: N/A

1999: N/A

2004:  Jerry Miculek 1893-122x

2006:  Frank Reiche 1852-124x

2008:  Vance Schmid *1902-133x (High Score)

2010:   Tony Drabsch 1887-125x

NRA World Action Pistol Champions – Production

2010:  Marc Kleser 1839-109x

NRA World Action Champions – Stock Gun

1999: United Kingdom

Multiple and consecutive Bianchi Cup champions

Media coverage
Since 2008, Shooting USA on the nationally syndicated Outdoor Channel has covered the NRA Bianchi Cup championship.
It has also been covered in other press, including numerous professional and amateur videos uploaded to YouTube, Shooting Sports USA the digital magazine, American Rifleman magazine, Down Range TV with Michael Bane, and various firearms blogs.

See also
Action Shooting
Bianchi International
International Practical Shooting Confederation
National Rifle Association of America
Steel Challenge
United States Practical Shooting Association

Notes

References

External links 
 
 http://www.nrahq.org/compete NRA Competitive Shooting Programs
 http://www.nrablog.com The NRA Blog
 http://www.downrange.tv/blog/?p=1115
 http://www.bianchi-intl.com/history.html
 http://www.columbiatribune.com/news/2009/mar/29/bianchi-cup-draws-worlds-most-skilled-handguns/
 http://www.myoutdoortv.com/news/nra-bianchi-cup-unveils-speed-star-event-honoring-ray-chapman.html
 http://www.paramuspost.com/article.php/20090601122936792
 http://www.americanrifleman.org/Video.aspx?vid=1877
 http://www.americanrifleman.org/Video.aspx?vid=1879
 http://www.issuu.com/compshoot/docs/2011nrabianchiguide

Shooting competitions in the United States
Handgun shooting sports
Shooting sports in the United States